Peter McDonald (born 22 September 1978) is an Australian former professional road cyclist. He won the Australian National Road Race Championships in 2009.

McDonald grew up in Armidale in country NSW. Both of his parents were school teachers. He worked as a school teacher in Darwin for a couple of years before returning to NSW where he began work as a bicycle courier in Sydney.  A fellow courier introduced him to racing at Randwick Botany Cycling Club located at Heffron Park in Sydney's south east. Eventually he began to ride full-time for a number of smaller local teams. Coached by Adam Hogan of Cheeky Transport Bike shop he won Australia's Grafton-Inverell race, and won first National Road series win in Victoria at Bright. This led to riding for the Drapac Porsche team.

Major results 

2006
 4th Road race, National Road Championships
2007
 3rd Overall FBD Insurance Ras
2008
 4th Overall Tour de Taiwan
1st Stage 3
 7th Overall Tour de Hokkaido
1st Stage 5
2009
 1st Overall UCI Oceania Tour
 1st  Road race, National Road Championships
 1st Overall Tour of Wellington
1st Stage 2
 2nd Overall Tour de Taiwan
 10th Overall Ronde de l'Oise
2010
 2nd Japan Cup Cycle Road Race
 4th Overall Tour de Langkawi
1st  Mountains classification
 6th Overall Tour of Wellington
1st Stage 1

References 

Australian male cyclists
Living people
1978 births
Cyclists from New South Wales